The Evolution of Human Sexuality is a 1979 book about human sexuality by the anthropologist Donald Symons, in which the author discusses topics such as human sexual anatomy, ovulation, orgasm, homosexuality, sexual promiscuity, and rape, attempting to show how evolutionary concepts can be applied to humans. Symons argues that the female orgasm is not an adaptive trait and that women have the capacity for it only because orgasm is adaptive for men, and that differences between the sexual behavior of male and female homosexuals help to show underlying differences between male and female sexuality. In his view, homosexual men tend to be sexually promiscuous because of the tendency of men in general to desire sex with a large number of partners, a tendency that in heterosexual men is usually restrained by women's typical lack of interest in promiscuous sex. Symons also argues that rape can be explained in evolutionary terms and feminist claims that it is not sexually motivated are incorrect.

The book received several positive reviews, as well as some criticism: it was described as the most important work on human sociobiology to date, but also dismissed as an impoverished work. It has been seen as a classic work on human sexual evolution and used as a textbook, though critics have questioned Symons's explanation of the female orgasm and his suggestion that eliminating rape "might well entail a cure worse than the disease". The work influenced the biologist Randy Thornhill and the anthropologist Craig T. Palmer's A Natural History of Rape (2000). Symons's arguments about homosexuality have received both criticism and support from commentators, and he has been both accused of supporting genetic determinism and sexism, and defended against the charge.

Summary
Symons argues that women and men have different sexual natures, apparent in their typical "sexual behaviors, attitudes, and feelings", but partially concealed by moral injunctions and the compromises inherent in relations between the sexes. He attributes these differences to human evolutionary history, writing that during its hunting and gathering phase, the sexual desires and dispositions that were adaptive for men obstructed reproduction for women, while those that were adaptive for women obstructed reproduction for men. He writes that his discussion of sex differences in sexuality is not intended to affect social policy. He discusses evolutionary concepts and the difficulties involved in applying them to humans, the capacity for orgasm, the loss of human estrus, sexual selection and its components intrasexual competition and sexual choice, the desire for sexual variety, and the development of human ovulation. He argues that among all peoples, sex is typically understood to be a service that females render to males.

In the introduction, Symons argues that modern understandings of "natural selection" and "fitness" are value-free, the latter term measuring reproductive success rather than referring to human value judgments; that it is necessary to distinguish between proximate and ultimate explanations of animal behavior, the former being concerned with how animals come to develop behavior patterns, and the latter with why they develop these patterns; that while a feature of structure or behavior may benefit an animal, only features that result from natural selection should be considered functions; that the persistence of the nature–nurture controversy is partly the result of failing to distinguish between proximate and ultimate causation; that learning abilities are more often concerned with specific problems than they are the expression of general capacities; and that the secondary sex differences that exist in animals of most species are the consequences the different reproductive behaviors of males and females.

According to Symons, while orgasm in the human female has been proposed to be an adaptation resulting from selective forces, the available evidence, which shows that the female orgasm is far from being a universal result of heterosexual intercourse and that its frequency varies greatly between cultures and between individuals, does not support that conclusion. Symons suggested that the female orgasm may be possible for female mammals because it is adaptive for males. He notes that in most mammalian species the only known function of the clitoris is to generate sensation during copulation, but saw no evidence that "the female genitals of any mammalian species have been designed by natural selection for efficiency in orgasm production." He criticizes Elizabeth Sherfey's view that the female orgasm is an adaptation, writing that her arguments are not supported by ethnographic or biological evidence. Symons proposes that male human ancestors lost the ability to detect ovulation in females by smell because females gained a reproductive advantage by concealing ovulation, and that estrus ceased to exist in humans at the same time. Observing that estrous female chimpanzees are more successful than nonestrous females in obtaining meat from males, Symons suggests that when hunting became a dominant male economic activity during human evolution, the benefits to females of receiving meat may have outweighed the costs to them of constant sexual activity, leading to women making sexual overtures to men in order to obtain meat.

In his discussion of "the desire for sexual variety", Symons reviews literature on the "Coolidge effect", the "phenomenon of male rearousal by a new female". Discussing rape, Symons suggests that because males can "potentially sire offspring at almost no cost ... selection favors male attempts to copulate with fertile females whenever this potential can be realized." He criticizes the feminist Susan Brownmiller's argument in Against Our Will (1975) that rape is not sexually motivated, writing that she inadequately documents her thesis and that all of the reasons that she and other authors have given for concluding that rapists are not motivated by sexual desire are open to criticism. Symons writes that Brownmiller's claim that the function of rape is to keep all women in a state of fear has been "vigorously contested", and that it is also an example of a naïve form of functionalism, which is unacceptable since no process that might generate such "functions" has been shown to exist. Symons argues that socialization towards a "more humane sexuality" requires the inhibition of impulses that are part of human nature because they have proved adaptive over millions of years, and concluded that while under the right rearing conditions, "males could be produced who would want only the kinds of sexual interactions that women want" this "might well entail a cure worse than the disease." He considers the major contribution of feminist investigations of rape to be to document the perspective of its victims, showing, for example, that they do not want to be raped.

Symons considers two different kinds of evidence especially important in supporting his claim that there are typical differences between the sexual desires and dispositions of men and women: hormone studies and the behavior of male and female homosexuals. Because homosexuals do not have to "compromise sexually with members of the opposite sex" their sex lives "should provide dramatic insight into male sexuality and female sexuality in their undiluted states." According to Symons, fundamental differences between men and women are apparent from the fact that, while there is a substantial industry producing pornography for male homosexuals, no pornography is produced for lesbians, and that lesbians, as compared to male homosexuals, have much greater interest in forming stable and monogamous relationships and having sex with loving partners.

He argues that the similarities between heterosexual and lesbian relationships, and the differences between both and the relations of male homosexuals, show that "the sexual proclivities of homosexual males are very rarely manifested in behavior." He proposes that heterosexual men would be as promiscuous as homosexual men tend to be if most women were interested in engaging in promiscuous heterosexual sex, and that it is women's lack of interest that prevents this. He considers, but rejects, alternative explanations for the differences between male homosexual and lesbian behavior, such as the effects of socialization, finding them unsupported. He concludes that while the "existence of large numbers of exclusive homosexuals in contemporary Western societies attests to the importance of social experience in determining the objects that humans sexually desire", the fact that male homosexual behavior in some ways resembles an exaggerated version of male heterosexual behavior, and lesbian behavior in some ways resembles an exaggerated version of female heterosexual behavior, indicates that other aspects of human sexuality are not affected by social influences to the same extent.

Background and publication history
According to Symons, the ideas that he developed in The Evolution of Human Sexuality were partly inspired by a conversation he had with the ethologist Richard Dawkins in 1968. Symons, who had concluded that "men tend to want a variety of sexual partners and women tend not to because this desire always was adaptive for ancestral males and never was adaptive for ancestral females", found that Dawkins had independently reached the same conclusion. Symons presented an early draft of the book during a 1974 seminar on primate and human sexuality he co-taught with the anthropologist Donald Brown. Symons argued in the draft that there are universal human sex differences.

Brown assisted Symons in writing the book. The book was first published in hardcover by Oxford University Press in 1979. A paperback edition followed in 1981.

Reception

Mainstream media
The Evolution of Human Sexuality received a negative review from the anthropologist Clifford Geertz in The New York Review of Books. Subsequent discussions include those by the anthropologist Craig Stanford in American Scientist and the evolutionary psychologist Nigel Barber in Psychology Today.

Geertz wrote that "virtually none" of Symons's claims are based on research Symons conducted himself, and that Symons "made no direct inquiries into human sexuality", instead basing himself on anthropological reports and other material, resulting in a book that is "a pastiche more than a study". He accused Symons of supporting his views through selective use of evidence, such as an "extremely brief and fragmentary" review of the effects of hormones on human sexuality. He considered Symons's characterizations of male and female homosexuals to be on the level of national or ethnic stereotypes, and found it questionable whether Symons's observations support his claims about differences between male and female sexuality. He questioned whether Symons was correct to believe it possible to determine what natures and dispositions men and women have prior to the influence of human culture, and criticized Symons for viewing human sexuality as a biological fact with cultural implications rather than a cultural activity sustaining a biological process. He disagreed with the favorable views of The Evolution of Human Sexuality expressed by the biologists E. O. Wilson and George C. Williams, and the then president of the American Anthropological Association, calling the work impoverished. He wrote that if the book was the most important work on human sociobiology to date, this was unfortunate.

Stanford described the book as "an early think piece rather than a thorough review of actual behavior." He noted that the biologist Randy Thornhill and the anthropologist Craig T. Palmer cited The Evolution of Human Sexuality extensively in their work A Natural History of Rape (2000), but criticized them for relying on Symons as an "authority on human mating". Barber, writing in 2011, described The Evolution of Human Sexuality as the "classic rejoinder" to Brownmiller's argument that rape is not sexually motivated, and credited Symons with a "resounding defeat of Brownmiller". However, he wrote that since it was published, date rape has emerged as the most common type of sexual assault and that "College men do not fit the profile of rapists drawn by Symons because they have high social status rather than being underprivileged."

Scientific and academic journals, 1979–2000
The Evolution of Human Sexuality received positive reviews from the anthropologist Sarah Blaffer Hrdy in The Quarterly Review of Biology and the psychologists Martin Daly and Margo Wilson in The Sciences, a mixed review from Elmer S. Miller in Social Science Quarterly, and a negative review from the anthropologist Judith Shapiro in Science. Subsequent discussions include those by Lisa Sanchez in Gender Issues.

Hrdy credited Symons with being one of the first to apply evolutionary theory to human sexuality and described The Evolution of Human Sexuality as "an insightful, theoretically sophisticated, and delightfully literate examination of the sexual emotions of men and women" and "the best available study of human sexual emotions." She predicted that many social scientists, but few zoologists, would disagree with Symons's conclusion that there are innate psychological differences between men and women. She found Symons's review of biological literature on the "Coolidge effect", and the sociobiological literature on adultery, valuable, and although she found his "extrapolating from the Coolidge effect to human philandering" open to question, considered his discussion of the relationship between nature and culture more sophisticated than that of most sociobiologists. She credited Symons with usefully drawing on both traditional anthropology and sociobiology. She found his treatment of female sexuality both more original and more controversial than his treatment of male sexuality, and argued against his view that many aspects of female sexuality, such as the female orgasm, were only accidental by-products of evolution.

Daly and Wilson wrote that Symons brought an "even-handed, critical intelligence" to the discussion of the evolutionary basis of sex differences, and that he was willing to criticize the writings of sociobiologists where appropriate. However, they found Symons's discussion of the evolution of concealment of ovulation in humans less useful than that of several other authors, including Hrdy, and concluded that Symons was not fully successful in establishing criteria to determine whether a given feature of an animal is an adaptation. They observed that though "seemingly bizarre", Symons's argument that the sexual behavior of homosexuals helps to test hypotheses about sex differences in sexuality is logical.

Miller described The Evolution of Human Sexuality as well-written and fascinating, but argued that Symons, with his focus on reproductive success, did not fully answer questions about "the relevance of nonhuman animal studies for an understanding of human social life." He pointed to infanticide as an example of a phenomenon that was difficult to explain in terms of reproductive success arguments, especially since "killing is generally performed by the mother." He also argued that "the epistemological foundation of research that assigns culture the status of epiphenomena" was open to debate, and that Symons limited the value of his contributions by ignoring the "question of cultural significance".

Shapiro considered Symons's thesis about human sexuality unprovable, and argued that by outlining the relevant theoretical and methodological issues carefully and clearly he showed the difficulties to be greater than he realized. She maintained that his conclusions were only acceptable if one already agreed with sociobiology. She wrote that he attached too much importance to the idea that reproductive strategies explain relations between men and women, thereby connecting human sexuality too closely to reproduction, and accused him of showing no awareness of "the many meanings that sex can take on in different cultural settings." She criticized his views on subjects such as the motivations for rape, marriage, and the female orgasm, and also faulted the quality of his "cross-cultural data on erotic activity." She described his argument that "the innate sexual tendencies of men and women are mostly truly expressed in the behavior of homosexuals" as "ingenious". She also maintained that his work was unlikely to appeal to social scientists.

Sanchez noted that Symons's view that rape is not an adaptation has been questioned by Thornhill and Palmer. However, she considered Symons correct to caution that the available data are insufficient to support the conclusion that rape is an adaptation.

Scientific and academic journals, 2001–present
The socialist feminist Lynne Segal argued in Psychology, Evolution & Gender that Symons mistakenly believed that women, by being "continuously copulable", cause men to desire to engage in promiscuous sexual relations with them. She saw Symons's endorsement of the "genetic determinism" of the biologist Randy Thornhill and the anthropologist Craig T. Palmer's A Natural History of Rape (2000) as following from the views he expressed in The Evolution of Human Sexuality.

Palmer and Thornhill noted in the Journal of Sex Research that while Symons stated that did not "believe that available data are even close to sufficient to warrant the conclusion" that rape is a "facultative adaptation in the human male" and therefore concluded instead that rape is "a by-product of various different sexual adaptations in men and women", he failed to specify exactly how the available data were insufficient to support the conclusion that rape is a facultative adaptation or what kind of data might potentially demonstrate that rape is a facultative adaptation. They added that given Symons's failure to explain the shortcomings of the available data or explain how it could be improved upon, it was understandable that the question of whether rape is an adaptation was more thoroughly investigated by other researchers, including Thornhill himself.

Jocelyn Bosley described The Evolution of Human Sexuality as an influential work in Signs. However, she criticized Symons for accepting at face value the idea that men are "more motivated than women to seek sex." Bosley wrote that Symons argued that female orgasm is a byproduct of the existence of the male orgasm through an "infamous and widely cited" comparison of the female orgasm to male nipples. She questioned the idea that Symons's willingness to separate "female orgasm from female reproductive fitness" has feminist implications, writing that while Symons "lent scientific support to some feminists' claims for a primordial similarity between male and female sexuality", other feminists found his account of female orgasm "socially and politically regrettable". She concluded that Symons "thoroughly undercut the position of feminists who maintained that true sexual equality would be achieved only when peculiarly female sexual experiences were recognized and galvanized as the basis for a new, egalitarian sexuality."

David Puts, Khytam Dawood, and Lisa Welling argued in the Archives of Sexual Behavior that while Symons's proposal that the human female orgasm is a non-functional byproduct of orgasm in men is plausible, it is a hypothesis that "currently lacks empirical support", that there is some counter evidence, and that the issue remains unresolved.

Dean Lee argued in Biology and Philosophy that Symons's account of the female orgasm has been misinterpreted in the scholarly literature. According to Lee, while Symons's case that the female orgasm is not an adaptation attracted controversy, little attention was given to the alternative explanation of the female orgasm Symons provided. He described this alternative explanation as "obscure, complicated, and frankly speculative". He maintained that Symons did not, as has been assumed, offer the same explanation of the female orgasm as that later put forward by the evolutionary biologist Stephen Jay Gould, according to which the female orgasm is possible because of the clitoris, which is a byproduct of the embryological connection with the male penis. He identified Symons's alternative argument as being contained in the sentence in which Symons wrote that, "The female orgasm may be a byproduct of mammalian bisexual potential: orgasm may be possible for female mammals because it is adaptive for males." He interpreted Symons as maintaining that orgasm is a typically male trait based on a mechanism in the brain that exists in individuals of both sexes: a woman who experiences an orgasm during heterosexual intercourse is exhibiting bisexual behavior because her mating response to a male is female behavior and her orgasm is a male behavior. He questioned whether Symons actually intended to make an analogy between the existence of the female orgasm and that of the male nipple, writing that Symons's comments on the issue had been taken out of context.

Other evaluations, 1979–1992
Brian Easlea argued against Symons that desire for anonymous sex is actually typical only of sexist men and is not characteristic of men in general. He rejected Symons's view that socializing men to "want only the kinds of sexual interactions that women want...might well entail a cure worse than the disease". The feminist Susan Griffin considered Symons's view that the female orgasm is only a byproduct of selection for the male orgasm an example of the ideology of the "pornographic mind", which conceives of female sexuality as "an empty space which craves male presence, and which cannot exist without the male". Hrdy argued that for Symons, "women have sexual feelings for much the same reason that men have nipples: nature makes the two sexes as variations on the same basic model", a view of female sexuality she considered reminiscent of Aristotle and 19th century Victorianism.

The biologists Richard Lewontin and Steven Rose, writing with the psychologist Leon Kamin, observed that, like some other sociobiologists, Symons maintains that "the manifest trait is not itself coded by genes, but that a potential is coded and the trait only arises when the appropriate environmental cue is given." In their view, "Despite its superficial appearance of dependence on environment, this model is completely genetically determined, independent of the environment." They concluded that Symons's arguments provide examples "of how sociobiological theory can explain anything, no matter how contradictory, by a little mental gymnastics". The biologist Anne Fausto-Sterling observed that while Symons believes that rape should be eliminated, he also states that the rearing conditions needed to eliminate rape "might well entail a cure worse than the disease." She criticized his position. Daniel Rancour-Laferriere described The Evolution of Human Sexuality as an "important treatise". However, he argued that the evidence Symons cites about animal behavior actually suggests that the female orgasm is adaptive.

The sociologist Jeffrey Weeks criticized Symons's view that differences between male and female sexual attitudes have a biological basis, arguing that it was not supported by Symons's evidence. The gay rights activist Dennis Altman argued that Symons wrongly maintained that gay men, due to their nature as men, are incapable of monogamy. The philosopher Michael Ruse concluded that while Symons's explanation of male homosexual promiscuity could be correct, it depends on controversial and disputable claims. The ethologist Irenäus Eibl-Eibesfeldt questioned Symons's argument that the absence of visible female estrus developed so that women could "offer themselves to men" for rewards of food. He noted that prey is shared in chimpanzees without sexual rewards. He rejected Symons's argument that the infrequency of the female orgasm shows that it has no function. The ecologist Jared Diamond called The Evolution of Human Sexuality "outstanding". The economist Richard Posner called the work the "best single book on the sociobiology of sex". The anthropologist Helen Fisher criticized Symons's view that "homosexual behavior illustrates essential truths about male and female sexual natures". The psychologists Steven Pinker and Paul Bloom wrote that Symons's observation that "tribal chiefs are often both gifted orators and highly polygynous" helps to show "how linguistic skills could make a Darwinian difference."

Other evaluations, 1993–2004
The journalist Matt Ridley argued that Symons's ideas about the evolution of gender differences had revolutionary implications, since "the overwhelming majority of the research that social scientists had done on human sexuality was infused with the assumption that there are no mental differences" between the sexes. He endorsed Symons's explanation of male homosexual promiscuity. The psychologist David Buss called The Evolution of Human Sexuality "the most important treatise on the evolution of human sexuality in the twentieth century" and a "classic treatise".

The journalist Robert Wright called the book "the first comprehensive anthropological survey of human sexual behavior from the new Darwinian perspective". He credited Symons with showing that the tendency for men to be more interested than women in having sex with multiple sexual partners holds good across many cultures and is not restricted to western society. The philosopher Maxine Sheets-Johnstone observed that while The Evolution of Human Sexuality is "used as a textbook and is considered a major formulation of human sexuality", she sees as the work "a paradigm of the prevailing Western biological view" of female sexuality, a view she considers "essentially male". The critic Joseph Carroll described the book as a "standard work" on its subject. However, he criticized Symons's arguments about homosexuality. The sociologist Tim Megarry dismissed The Evolution of Human Sexuality as, "a projection of American dating culture onto prehistory". The anthropologist Meredith Small argued that the work of sex researchers Masters and Johnson, which shows that the female clitoris is made of the same tissue as the penis and responds sexually in a similar manner, suggests that the clitoris results from an embryonic connection with the male penis and supports Symons's view that it is not an adaptation.

Williams called The Evolution of Human Sexuality one of the classic works on "the biology of human sexual attitudes", alongside the work of Hrdy. Alan F. Dixson described Symons's explanation of male homosexual promiscuity as "interesting". The biologist Paul R. Ehrlich described The Evolution of Human Sexuality as a "classic but controversial treatise on human sexual evolution". He identified Symons's study of the development of human ovulation as a landmark. Thornhill and Palmer identified Symons as the first author to propose that rape is by-product of evolutionary adaptations. They observed that Symons has falsely been accused of basing his arguments on the assumption that behavior is genetically determined, even though he explicitly rejects that assumption and criticizes it at length. They endorsed his explanation of male homosexual promiscuity, and his arguments against the idea that rape is not sexually motivated.

Gould commented that the argument that the clitoris is not adaptive, put forward by Symons and subsequently by Gould himself, has been widely misunderstood as a denial of the adaptive value of the female orgasm in general, or even as a claim that female orgasms lack significance. The anthropologist Melvin Konner called The Evolution of Human Sexuality "the classic introduction to the evolutionary dimensions" of sex. Pinker called The Evolution of Human Sexuality "groundbreaking". He criticized what he considered personal abuse of Symons by Lewontin et al. in their discussion of the book.

Other evaluations, 2005–present
Buss called The Evolution of Human Sexuality the first "watershed in the study of human mating strategies" to follow evolutionary biologist Robert Trivers' 1972 paper "Parental Investment and Sexual Selection" and a "trenchant classic". He credited Symons with being "the first to articulate the theoretical foundations of a fully adaptationist view of male and female mating minds" and "the first social scientist to take the writings of George C. Williams ... to heart, applying rigorous standards for invoking the critical but challenging concept adaptation." He described The Evolution of Human Sexuality as "the first major treatise on evolutionary psychology proper, highlighting the centrality of psychological mechanisms as adaptations and using human sexuality as a detailed vehicle for this more general argument."

Elizabeth Lloyd concluded that Symons proposes "the best available explanation for the evolution of the female orgasm", stating that while Symons's conclusions are not beyond dispute, and have been criticized on a number of different grounds, they are consistent with existing evidence, and help to explain "otherwise mysterious findings." Thornhill and Steven W. Gangestad described The Evolution of Human Sexuality as "a landmark in the study of human sexuality" and "the first serious effort to investigate and inquire into the nature of human sexuality". They added that many of Symons's ideas have received support, including his view that women's sexuality includes "sexual adaptation that functions to gain access to nongenetic material benefits from males through its expression when women are not fertile within their menstrual cycles."

The anthropologists Anne Bolin and Patricia Whelehan identified as Symons one of two major participants in the debate over the reproductive role of the female orgasm, the other being Sherfey. They wrote that Symons's view of female sexuality "reflects western concepts of the passive female and overlooks the evidence of actual female sexual functioning, such as the capacity for multiple orgasms in women." They considered the female orgasm more likely to be "an extension of the pleasurable sensations associated with coitus in primate females generally" than a by-product of the male orgasm, as proposed by Symons. They observed that while Lloyd endorsed Symons's view, her work has been "severely criticized" by the psychologist David P. Barash, and the relationship between female orgasm and reproduction remains a topic of ongoing debate. Christopher Ryan and Cacilda Jethá called The Evolution of Human Sexuality a "classic". However, they also accused Symons of having a "bleak" vision of human sexuality. The anthropologist Peter B. Gray and Justin R. Garcia maintained that demographic data supports an evolutionary account of human mating psychology similar to that proposed by Symons.

See also
Gay pornography
Lesbian erotica

References

Bibliography
Books

 
 
 
 
 
 
 
 
 
 
 
 
 
 
 
 
 
 
 
 
 
 
 
 
 
 
 
 
 
 
 
 
 
 
 
 

Journals

  
  
 
 
  
  
  
  
  
  
 
  

Online articles

 

1979 non-fiction books
American non-fiction books
Books about evolutionary psychology
Books about orgasm
Books about rape
Books by Donald Symons
English-language books
Oxford University Press books